OTZ or otz may refer to:

 Oetz or Ötz, a municipality in Austria
 abbreviation for the German newspaper, Ostthüringer Zeitung
 IATA code for Ralph Wien Memorial Airport in Alaska
 OTZ, a posture emoticon used for representing a great admiration, see Emoticon#Orz
 ISO 639-3 language code for Ixtenco Otomi, a native American language spoken in San Juan Bautista Ixtenco, Tlaxcala, Mexico